The Vitra Design Museum is a privately owned museum for design in Weil am Rhein, Germany.

Former Vitra CEO, and son of Vitra founders Willi and Erika Fehlbaum, Rolf Fehlbaum founded the museum in 1989 as an independent private foundation. The Vitra corporation provides it with a financial subsidy, the use of Vitra architecture, and organizational cooperation.

Collection and activities 

The museum's collection, focusing on furniture and interior design, is centered on the bequest of U.S. designers Charles and Ray Eames, as well as numerous works of designers such as George Nelson, Alvar Aalto, Verner Panton, Dieter Rams, Jean Prouvé, Richard Hutten and Michael Thonet. It is one of the world's largest collections of modern furniture design, including pieces representative of all major periods and styles from the beginning of the nineteenth century onwards.

These works, originally the private collection of Rolf Fehlbaum, are now permanently on display at the newly completed Schaudepot building on the Vitra premises. In addition, the museum puts on temporary exhibitions in the main building, often with loans from other collections. In turn, parts of the collection are lent to other institutions around the world.

In addition, the museum produces workshops, publications and museum products, as well as maintaining an archive, a restoration and conservation laboratory, and a research library. It also organises guided tours of the Vitra premises, a major attraction to those interested in modern architecture. The museum produced the travelling exhibition 'Rudolf Steiner - Alchemy of the Everyday', a major retrospective exhibition drawn from its own collection and borrowed exhibits, coinciding with the one hundred and fiftieth anniversary of the birth of its subject.

Museum building 
The museum building, an architectural attraction in its own right, was Frank O. Gehry's first building in Europe, realised in cooperation with the Lörrach architect Günter Pfeifer. Together with the museum, which was originally just designed to house Rolf Fehlbaum's private collection, Gehry also built a more functional-looking production hall and a gatehouse for the close-by Vitra factory.

Although Gehry used his trademark sculptural deconstructivist style for the museum building, he did not opt for his usual mix of materials, but limited himself to white plaster and a titanium–zinc alloy. For the first time, he allowed curved forms to break up his more usual angular shapes. The sloping white forms appear to echo the Notre Dame du Haut chapel by Le Corbusier in Ronchamp, France, not far from Weil.

Architecture critic Paul Heyer described the general impression on the visitor as 

The building backs the factory fence and is embedded in a meadow adorned with cherry trees. Claes Oldenburg and Coosje van Bruggen's prominent sculpture Balancing Tools provides a colourful contrast, while Tadao Ando's nearby conference pavilion gives a more muted one.

External links 

Vitra Design Museum Website
Vitra Design Museum on greatbuildings.com
Vitra Design Museum on the Guggenheim Foundation website

Notes

Art museums established in 1989
Frank Gehry buildings
Design museums
Art museums and galleries in Germany
Modernist architecture in Germany
Museums in Baden-Württemberg
1989 establishments in West Germany
German design